Sohrab Kashani is an Iranian artist and contemporary art curator.

Work as artist

Super Sohrab (2009-present)
Super Sohrab, Kashani’s alter-ego is a superhero who utilises satire and failure in their attempts to navigate the everyday challenges of daily life. Through the documentation of some of their own life events and their own failures, Super Sohrab addresses local and global socio-political problems. Super Sohrab's work often comprises performative interventions presented in photographs, videos, comics, text, and other formats. Super Sohrab also arm-wrestles in public to challenge and discuss power dynamics and sets up lifting workshops to practice resilience and resistance.

The Other Apartment (2019-2020)
The Other Apartment was a collaborative project between Kashani and Pittsburgh-based artist Jon Rubin that occurred simultaneously in Kashani's apartment in Tehran and an exact replica of that apartment and all of its contents at the Mattress Factory museum in Pittsburgh, U.S. Using detailed photographs from Kashani (who was not able to travel to the U.S. due to the travel ban on Iranian citizens), the artists worked with a team of fabricators to meticulously recreate his Tehran apartment's facade, interior architecture, and all of his personal possessions. From his soap dish to his furniture, everything in The Other Apartment was purchased, altered, or entirely fabricated to replicate what existed in Kashani's apartment. Located within The Other Apartment, in both Tehran and Pittsburgh, was Sazmanab, Kashani's contemporary art space. Sazmanab produced programs where every object, video, and performance that happened in one space was meticulously duplicated for the other.

Darookhaneh Apotheke Pharmacy (2022)
Darookhaneh Apotheke Pharmacy was a collaborative project between Kashani and London-based artist Anahita Razmi. It comprised a large installation filled with Iranian pharmaceuticals and medication packages at uqbar projectspace in Berlin and an online conversation platform for discussing global imbalances in health economies and logistics. Transcultural (dis)connections, inequalities in distribution, pharma-economic power dynamics, trade restrictions, and legal obstacles were some of the topics echoed in the exhibition.

Work as curator

Sazmanab (2008-present)
Sazmanab is a curatorial project by Kashani which he originally started as an artist-run space and residency program in Tehran in 2008.  From 2008 to 2014, Sazmanab was located in an apartment in the Sadeghiyeh district of Tehran and later in 2014 was relocated to an old building on Khaghani street near Darvaze Dolat in downtown Tehran. Sazmanab set up more than hundred events and exhibitions at its venues. Events included talks, presentations, lectures, panels, discussions, workshops, performances, screenings, book launches, and audio/visual performances. Sazmanab also held talks and presentations at universities, museums, and institutions and took part in international panels, seminars, and forums. Over the years, Sazmanab held some of its programming off-site in collaboration with other art spaces and art galleries.

Exhibitions curated
Sohrab Kashani and Joseph del Pesco, Voice-over (in three parts) Sazmanab (Tehran, Iran) and Mattress Factory Museum (Pittsburgh, PA, United States), 2019.
Sohrab Kashani, Shattered Frames: Recent video work from Iran, Carnegie Museum of Art, Pittsburgh, PA, United States, 2016.This series of videos was later screened in Tehran, at the Pejman Foundation Kandovan site.
Sohrab Kashani and Reza Aramesh, Centrefold Project: Spring of recession, Sazmanab, Tehran, Iran, 2015.
Sohrab Kashani, Mapping Within: An Alternative Guide to Tehran, The Mine, Dubai, UAE, 2015.
Sohrab Kashani, Lost & Found in Tehran: Contemporary Iranian Video, Columbus Museum of Art, Columbus, Ohio, United States, 2013.
Sohrab Kashani, Subjective Truth from Iran, Center for Contemporary Art Tbilisi (CCA-T), Tbilisi, Georgia, 2013.
Sohrab Kashani and Sandra Skurvida, Still Lives and Selected Acts, Dastan's Basement, Tehran, Iran, 2013.
Sohrab Kashani and Sandra Skurvida, TVDinner Tehran, Sazmanab (Tehran, Iran) and Immigrant Movement International (New York, USA), 2011.
Sohrab Kashani, The 1st Tehran Annual Digital Art Exhibition (TADAEX), Mohsen Gallery, Tehran, Iran, 2011.
Sohrab Kashani and Jon Rubin, The Tehran/Pittsburgh YouTube Mix, The YouTube School for Social Politics, 2009.

See also
Modern and contemporary art in Iran

References

External links

 

1989 births
Living people
Art curators
Iranian video artists
Conceptual artists
People from Tehran